Özcan Mutlu (born January 10, 1968) in Kelkit, Gümüşhane Province, Turkey, is a Turkish-German politician of the Green Party.

Early years
Mutlu has lived in the Berlin district of Kreuzberg since 1973 and received his naturalization in 1990. He finished his training as an information electrician at the Berlin Institute of Technology from September 1985 to February 1989. Afterwards, he studied electrical engineering at the Beuth University of Applied Sciences Berlin from 1989 to 1993 and graduated as engineer of communication and electronics. He combined an internship with a stay abroad in Omaha, (USA). After this, he worked in a telecommunication company as engineer from 1993 to 1999.

Political career
Mutlu joined the Green Party in 1990, and was elected into the district assembly of Kreuzberg. He entered the regional parliament Abgeordnetenhaus of Berlin in 1999 representing the district Friedrichshain-Kreuzberg. He was re-elected in 2006 and 2011. During this period, he served in a number of parliamentary commissions, responsible particularly for policies of education, integration and migration as well as policies for Europe and Turkey.

Mutlu was nominated by his party for the 2009 federal election; however, he missed the entry into the Bundestag. Following the 2013 federal election, Mutlu won a seat in the Bundestag. He was one of the eleven politicians of Turkish descent who entered the federal parliament, including seven women. In parliament, he served on the Committee on Education, Research and Technology Assessment. On the committee, he was his parliamentary group’s rapporteur on citizen participation.

Other activities
 Bilingual German-Turkish Europe School, Founding Member
 Sister city agreement between Kreuzberg and Kadıköy, Istanbul, Founding Member
 German Marshall Fund, Marshall-Memorial Fellow
 Stiftung Lesen, Member of the Board of Trustees 
 Young leader of the Atlantik-Brücke (2000)

Controversy
When Mutlu voted in a favor of a symbolic resolution in 2016 that remembered and condemned the 1915 Armenian genocide by Ottoman forces, which Turkey refuses to acknowledge, he became one of eleven MPs of Turkish origin who received increased police protection and further security measures for both their professional and private activities. Also, Germany's foreign ministry warned him against travelling to Turkey because his safety could not be guaranteed after statements by Turkish President Tayyip Erdoğan suggesting that German lawmakers of Turkish origin had "tainted blood".

Personal life
Özcan Mutlu is married and has two children.

References

External links
 Personal website

1968 births
Living people
Turkish emigrants to West Germany
German politicians of Turkish descent
Naturalized citizens of Germany
People from Kelkit
Technical University of Berlin alumni
Turkish electrical engineers
Members of the Abgeordnetenhaus of Berlin
Members of the Bundestag for Berlin
Members of the Bundestag 2013–2017
Members of the Bundestag for Alliance 90/The Greens
Politicians from Berlin